Passion is the eleventh studio album by Murray Head. It was released on October 8, 2002.

Track listing
All songs composed by Murray Head unless noted.
"Say It Ain't So, Joe" - 4:29
"Never Even Thought" - 4:38
"Mademoiselle" - 4:07
"Dearest Anne" (Jean Claude Dequeant, Murray Head, Yves Simon) - 2:00
"Hesitation Blues" (Rev. Gary Davis) - 3:12
"I'm Losing You" (John Lennon) - 3:31
"Comme des enfants qui jouent" (Head, Luc Plamondon) - 5:11
"Little Bit of Loving" - 4:21
"Affair Across a Crowded Room" - 4:12
"Sorry, I Love You" - 4:17
"Make It Easy" - 3:20
"When I'm Yours" - 4:02
"Ruthie" - 3:22
"Grace" - 3:43

External links
[ Passion] at Allmusic

Murray Head albums
2002 albums